Thank God for Believers is the seventh studio album by American country music artist Mark Chesnutt. His third album for Decca Records, it produced four singles on the Billboard Hot Country Songs charts between 1997 and 1998: the title track (number 2), "It's Not Over" (number 34), "I Might Even Quit Lovin' You" (number 18), and "Wherever You Are" (number 45). "Wherever You Are" was the first single of Chesnutt's career to miss the Top 40 on the country charts. With this album, Chesnutt is also reunited with producer Mark Wright, who produced Chesnutt's first four MCA Nashville albums.

"It's Not Over" was previously recorded by Chesnutt on his third album, 1992's Longnecks & Short Stories, and before that by Reba McEntire on her 1984 album My Kind of Country. The version included on this album is the same as on Longnecks & Short Stories. Chesnutt chose to include it because he felt that it should have been released as a single from the original album, and suggested that it be included to replace another song that he felt did not fit thematically with the rest of the album.

Track listing

Personnel
As listed in liner notes.
Mike Brignardello - bass guitar on "Useless"
Mark Chesnutt - lead vocals 
Buddy Emmons - steel guitar
Jana King Evans - background vocals on "Numbers on the Jukebox" and "Goodbye Heartache"
Pat Flynn - acoustic guitar
Larry Franklin - fiddle
Paul Franklin - steel guitar on "Useless"
Owen Hale - drums
B. James Lowry - acoustic guitar
Liana Manis - background vocals
Steve Nathan - piano, B-3 organ
Louis Dean Nunley - background vocals
Michael Rhodes - bass guitar
Brent Rowan - electric guitar
John Wesley Ryles - background vocals
Lisa Silver - background vocals on "Numbers on the Jukebox" and "Goodbye Heartache"
Hank Singer - fiddle on "Hello Honky Tonk"
Biff Watson - acoustic guitar on "Useless"
Bergen White - background vocals on "Numbers on the Jukebox" and "Goodbye Heartache"
Curtis Young - background vocals

String arrangements by Bergen White, Carl Gorodetzky conducting the Nashville String Machine.

Personnel on "It's Not Over"
Pat Flynn - acoustic guitar
Paul Franklin - steel guitar
Rob Hajacos - fiddle
Paul Leim - drums
Hargus "Pig" Robbins - piano
Brent Rowan - electric guitar
Biff Watson - acoustic guitar
Bob Wray - bass guitar

Chart performance

References

1997 albums
Mark Chesnutt albums
Decca Records albums
Albums produced by Mark Wright (record producer)